The Red River is a perennial river with no defined major catchment, located in the East Gippsland region of the Australian state of Victoria.

Course and features
The Red River rises in remote country in the Benedore River Reference Area in the Croajingolong National Park, and flows generally south by east, before reaching its mouth with Bass Strait southwest of Sandpatch Point in the Shire of East Gippsland. The river descends  over its  course.

See also

 List of rivers of Australia

References

External links
 

East Gippsland catchment
Rivers of Gippsland (region)
Croajingolong National Park